The Malaysia Davis Cup team represents Malaysia in Davis Cup tennis competition and are governed by the Lawn Tennis Association of Malaysia.

Malaysia currently compete in the Asia/Oceania Zone of Group III.  They have reached the semifinals of Group II on three occasions.

History
Malaysia competed in its first Davis Cup in 1957.

Dominic Ryan, a British-Malaysian expat is currently Team Captain. He recently won a hard contested match against China's Hongbin Wang in a 5-7 5-7 6-4 6-0 6-2 reversal.

Current team (2022) 

 Naufal Siddiq Kamaruzzaman
 Christian Andre Sheng Liew
 Hao Sheng Koay
 Syed Mohd Agil Syed Naguib

See also
Davis Cup
Malaysia Fed Cup team

External links

Davis Cup teams
Davis Cup
Davis Cup